Nophodoris is a genus of sea slugs, specifically dorid nudibranchs. They are marine gastropod molluscs in the family Discodorididae.

Species
Species so far described in this genus include:

Nophodoris armata Valdes & Gosliner, 2001
Nophodoris infernalis Valdes & Gosliner, 2001

References

Discodorididae